Chase is a turn-based computer game in which players are tasked with escaping from robots programmed to pursue and kill them. The player attempts to destroy the robots by moving in such a way that the robots collide with each other or other obstacles. The basic concept has been part of games stretching into the 1970s, and is among the earliest of the "standards" for microcomputer platforms. Many variations exist, the most notable being the home computer-based Escape! and Zombies, Daleks on MacOS and robots on Unix.

The original author of the game remains unknown, but it is highly likely it started on the DTSS system at Dartmouth College in the early 1970s. The first public versions appeared in Creative Computing magazine in early 1976 and a variety of modified versions appeared over the next few years. Daleks and robots both appeared in 1984, leading to another wave of similar versions. New ports continue to appear to this day.

Gameplay

Chase is played on a two-dimensional rectangular grid. The objective of the game is to escape from a number of robots, which have been programmed to kill the player.

The game is turn-based. In the original game, the player character starts at a randomly selected location. In some derivative versions, such as the GNOME version, the player starts at the centre of the grid. The robots start at randomly selected locations on the grid. Every time the player character moves a square in any direction (horizontally, vertically, or diagonally), each robot moves one square closer to their new location, in whichever direction is the shortest path. If the player character collides with a robot, they die and the game ends.

The player attempts to survive by causing the robots to kill themselves by colliding with other objects on the map. There are two major ways this occurs. In earlier versions derived from Chase!, there are a number of deadly objects on the map that will kill either the robots or the player. In later versions derived from robots, the map is initially clear and these hazards are created when two robots collide to create a pile of rubble. In either case, the player is attempting to move in such a way to cause the robots to collide with each other or stationary obstacles.

The player can also teleport into a randomly selected location in cases where escape is otherwise impossible. Teleportation counts as a move, and the robots will respond by moving towards the new location. Because the location is randomly selected, it is possible that the player teleports right into the path of a robot. In some versions of the game, there is a "safe teleport" feature which the player may use a limited number of times (for instance once per level) and there may also be a close-range weapon which kills all robots within the immediate vicinity, the use of which would be limited in a similar way.

A few versions also add a tank, which is not killed when colliding with the other objects and is deadly to all objects. It otherwise acts like the other robots.

The game is won when all of the robots are destroyed. In modern versions, this normally results in the game proceeding to another level with more robots. Traditionally, the number of robots increases by ten each level.

Other versions

Chase was originally written in Dartmouth BASIC on the DTSS system at Dartmouth College. The original author is unknown, and original versions of the source code have not been found.

The Jan-Feb 1976 issue of Creative Computing contains a version of this original code ported to the Honeywell 6000 series by Bill Cotter. It was republished in 1979's More BASIC Computer Games, at that time adding a note suggesting the original author was Mac Oglesby, a prolific game author of Dartmouth BASIC games from the mainframe era.

A series of relatively direct copies of this game appeared in computer magazines of the era, including one for the SWCP 4k BASIC, and a graphical version using the VDM-1 card for S-100 bus machines. It was also ported to the PLATO system's TUTOR language on the MODCOMP IV as HiVolts.

Many follow-up versions of the game were known as Escape!, although it is not clear when this name was first used. One such version appears in Announcing: Computer Games for the TRS-80, which added another enemy, the tank, and limited the player to two teleports per match. A commercial graphical version of Escape! was also sold by Sublogic as early as 1982, which added a real-time option that caused the robots to move even if the user didn't. A review of this version in Creative Computing once again attributed the original to Mac Oglesby.

A modified version of Escape! known as Robot Minefield was released in 1983 by Tim Hartnell and Nathan Butcher. This reduced the number of enemies to four and eliminated the tank. In addition, the player could only move in four directions (North, South, East, West) while the robots had the ability to move diagonally. The game was played in real time; as the player pondered his move, the robots would continue converging toward him. This version was published in the 1983 Giant Book of Computer Games.

The Unix-based robots was developed by Allan R. Black in November, 1984. In May 1985, it was posted to the Usenet newsgroup net.sources.games. It was then ported to the Berkeley Software Distribution by Ken Arnold. The BSD Unix version of robots first appeared in the 4.3BSD software release in June 1986.

See also

 Robotron: 2084, a real-time version

Notes

References

Linux games
Video games about robots
Software that uses ncurses
Unix games
Video games developed in the United States
Video games with textual graphics
Open-source video games
Mainframe games
MacOS games
ru:Robots